Kenn is a municipality of the Verbandsgemeinde Schweich on the banks of the Moselle in the Trier-Saarburg district, in Rhineland-Palatinate, Germany.

History
It can be assumed that the Celts began to live around today's Kenn as early as 250 BC. Finds in the vicinity prove their existence. It is unclear whether it was just a matter of individual small groups that were perhaps only passing through or whether larger tribes were already settled there. It is certain, however, that a local settlement of Roman origin emerged on the terrain of today's Kenn around 2,000 years ago.

There are several finds from the Iron Age as well as from the time of the Roman Empire. A copy of a statue of a Roman Naiad can be seen on the Roman Square in Kenn, whereas the well-preserved original is in the Rheinisches Landesmuseum Trier these days.
The town center has grown from the middle of the 2nd century on an area that encloses a former Roman manor. In the course of construction work in 1987, three cellars laid out in a row  were uncovered on an area of approx. 23 m x 4.40 m, of which the southern room was restored and can now be visited. The farmhouse, which was built in 1764 and now houses Kenn's local museum, was also built on this 'Villa Urbana', which is the name of the estate.

The first documented mentioning is dated to the year 893 AD. The name 'Cannis' is mentioned there, which can be derived from Latin and means something like 'reed bank'. The spelling Kenn has been used since the 18th century.

Kenn was strongly influenced by the Maximiner era. Although a documented mentioning of 633 AD turned out to be a forgery, there is still reason to assume that a donation of extensive seigneuries with fields, forests and villages (including Cannis) to St. Maximin's Abbey can be traced back to the Merovingian king Dagobert I. As early as 1797, in the Treaty of Campo Formio the entire left bank of the Rhine, including the local region around Kenn, was conquered during the War of the First Coalition and annexed by France. Under French territorial rule, Kenn was assigned to the Mairie Longuich in the Canton of Schweich. In 1802, during the period of Secularisation, the Benedictine Abbey of St. Maximin was abolished.

Population development

Politics

Municipal council
The municipal council of Kenn consists of 20 councillors, who were elected in the local elections on May 26, 2019 by personalized proportional representation, and the honorary local mayor as chairman.
The distribution of seats in the municipal council:

(FWG = "Freie Wählergruppe Kenn 1979 e.V.")

Mayor
Rainer Müller (CDU) has been the local mayor of Kenn since 2009. In the direct election on May 26, 2019, he was confirmed in his office for a further five years with a share of the vote of 68.44%. Müller's predecessor Manfred Nink (SPD) held the office from 1996 to 2009.

Attractions

 Directly on the banks of the Moselle is the Kenner Flur, a designated nature reserve with an old waterworks built in 1903. It serves as a nursery for bird species such as the great crested grebe, sand martin and little ringed plover as well as a rest area during bird migration.
 Local history museum, a fully furnished farmhouse with over 800 exhibits about the simple life of the rural population in the 19th and 20th century.
 Römerkeller at the Roman square, parts of a Roman Villa Urbana from the 2nd century.
 A former estate of the St. Maximin's Abbey, dated 1739.
 Herrenbor, the oldest preserved village well in the district, which was built around 1500 with late Gothic features.
 Parish Church of St. Margaret
 Kenner Ley in the west of the village, a steep bank section built with residential buildings from 1970 to 1990 around 60 meters above the Moselle valley.

Economy and infrastructure
In Kenn there is a catholic kindergarten, a primary school and a branch office of the Sparkasse Trier. There is also a pharmacy, an internist, a veterinarian and a dentist. Numerous small and medium-sized as well as industrial companies are based in Kenn.

The Moselle shopping centre in Kenn was opened in 1969. It is located directly on the Landesstraße 145 and on the Bundesautobahn 602. It was previously operated by Schmidt & Breug (1969-1986), Plaza (1986-1990), Continent (1990-1996), Interspar (1996-1999), Walmart (1999-2007) and Real (2007-2021). In 2019 the 50th anniversary was celebrated. The store was closed at the end of September 2021.

Transport
Kenn is located on the route of the former Moselle Railway. The Moselle cycle path runs through the village.

Road traffic
The following motorways lead from / to Kenn: 
 A 1 Saarbrücken - Wittlich - Euskirchen - Cologne
 A 64 Luxembourg (there it is called Autoroute 1) - Kenn
 A 602, which connects Kenn to the A 1

The following federal highways are connected to Kenn:
 B 52 near Trier-Ehrang 
 B 53 Trier – Schweich – Mehring – Bernkastel-Kues – Zell – Alf via the A 602

Public transport
Public transport in the tariff area of the Trier Region Transport Association is operated by Moselbahn GmbH and Robert-Reisen buses.

Moselle Bridge
In the west of the municipality, there is a Moselle bridge on the B 52 between Trier-Ehrang and Kenn. It connects the A 64, A 602, B 52 and B 53 with Kenn. The bridge has a footpath and cycle path that lead directly to the port of Trier and the centre of Ehrang.

Vineyards
 Kenner Held
 Maximiner Hofgarten

External links

 Official website of the municipality of Kenn

References

Trier-Saarburg